Pseudaestuariivita is a genus of bacteria from the family of Rhodobacteraceae with one known species (Pseudaestuariivita atlantica).

References

Rhodobacteraceae
Bacteria genera
Monotypic bacteria genera